Chumo (Hangul: 추모, Hanja: 鄒牟), posthumously Chumo the Holy (Hangul: 추모성왕, Hanja: 鄒牟聖王), was the founding monarch of the kingdom of Goguryeo, and was worshipped as a god-king by the people of Goguryeo and Goryeo. Chumo was originally a Buyeo slang for an excellent archer, which became his name later. He was commonly recorded as Jumong (Hangul: 주몽, Hanja: 朱蒙) by various Chinese literatures including history books written by Northern Qi and Tang—the name became dominant in future writings including Samguk Sagi and Samguk Yusa. Chumo's title was changed to Dongmyeong the Holy (Hangul: 동명성왕, Hanja: 東明聖王), literally translated to the Bright Holy King of the East, at some point of time prior to compilation of Samguk Sagi (1145). His other names include Chumong (Hangul: 추몽, Hanja: 鄒蒙), Jungmo (Hangul: 중모, Hanja: 中牟), Nakamu, or Tomo. In Samguk Sagi, he was recorded as Jumong with the surname Go (Hangul: 고, Hanja: 高), and was also known as Junghae (Hangul: 중해, Hanja: 衆解) or Sanghae (Hangul: 상해, Hanja: 象解).

Life and myth  
The records about Chumo are associated with both mythical and symbolic wordings. They are also mixed with legends about Dongmyeong of Buyeo involving supernatural events told among the people of Buyeo, Goguryeo, and Baekje—all monarchs from same ancestry. The founding myths of Goguryeo are told in ancient writings, including the Gwanggaeto Stele. The best-known version is found, with slight variations, in the Samguk Sagi, Samguk Yusa, and the "Dongmyeongwang" chapter (동명왕편, 東明王篇) of the Donggukisanggukjip (동국이상국집, 東國李相國集).

The following description is based on Samguk Sagi. As Eastern Buyeo did not exist at the time, consider it as Buyeo (or Northern Buyeo).

Birth 
Hae Buru (해부루, 解夫婁), the king of Buyeo, performed religious ceremonies in hope of having a son as he was getting old without an heir. When he arrived to Gonyeon (or Gon Pond) (곤연, 鯤淵), he noticed his horse was dropping its tears in front of large rock. The king ordered to remove the rock, and he found a young boy who looked like a golden frog. The king treated the kid as a gift from heaven, and named him Geumwa (금와, 金蛙). Hae Buru adopted Geumwa, and made him the Crown Prince when he became older.

Later, Aranbul (아란불, 阿蘭弗), the minister of Buyeo, told Hae Buru that he received the messages from the heaven. The heaven will send its descendent and create new kingdom above Buyeo, thus the king should resettle at Gaseopwon, a fertile land next to the ocean. Hae Buru and his followers relocated the capital, and created new kingdom called Eastern Buyeo. Meanwhile, in Buyeo, a person named Hae Mosu, self-proclaiming as the Son of Heaven, established the new capital at Buyeo.

After Hae Buru died, Geumwa became the next king of Eastern Buyeo. When he went to Wubalsu (or Wubal Pond), which is located at the south of Taebaeksan (or Taebaek Mountain), he met a woman named Yuhwa who was a daughter of Habaek. She told Geumwa that she was in exile by her father, because she slept with Hae Mosu, who was self claiming as the son of heaven, prior to the marriage. She explained Hae Mosu lured her to a place near Amrok (or Yalu River) next to Ungsimsan (or Ungsim Mountain). Geumwa thought her story strange, so he locked her in a room. While Yuhwa was locked, the sunlight followed her wherever she go, and she eventually became pregnant. After she gave a birth to a large egg, Geumwa gave the egg to dogs and pigs, but they refused to eat. He then put the egg on middle of the street, but cows and horses walked beside it. The egg was also thrown on the field, but birds came to protect it. After failing multiple attempts to crack the egg, Geumwa returned the egg to Yuhwa. Later, a boy was born from the egg. The young boy learned how to craft bow and arrows, and became the master of archery by age of 7 and earned the nickname Chumo, which was a slang word used to describe excellent archers by people of Buyeo.

Escaping Eastern Buyeo 
Daeso, the eldest of the seven sons of Geumwa, was worried Chumo would rise as a threat to him, but Geumwa commanded Chumo to take care of the horses.While raising the horses, Chumo intentionally gave more food to slow horses and gave less food to fast and talented horses to make them look unappealing and thin. When Geumwa went for hunting with others, Chumo was given the thin horse with fewer arrows, yet he was able to hunt more than anyone participated(because the horse was fast). The hunting episode increased Daeso's desire to kill Chumo. Seeing the increased threat, Yuhwa asked Chumo to leave the place and use his abilities elsewhere.

Chumo and his three friends—Oi, Mari, and Hyeopbo—escaped from Eastern Buyeo, followed by cavalries sent out by Daeso. Chumo and his companions arrived to Eomsasu (or Eomsa River), but failed to find bridge to cross the river. As the cavalries are approaching, Chumo asked the river to help, declaring him as the son of the Emperor of Heaven and grandson of Habaek. Answering Chumo's call, fishes and soft shell turtles floated from the river and created the bridge for Chumo to cross, then disappeared by the time troops arrived.

Founding of Goguryeo 
After escaping the death, Chumo met three people, each wearing different cloths at Modungok (or Modun Valley). Considering as gift from heaven, Chumo gave surname to each person: Jaesa, wearing hemp cloth, as Geuk Jaesa; Mugol, wearing monk cloth, as Jungsil Mugol; Mukgeo, wearing waterweed cloth, as Sosil Mukgeo. Chumo gave roles to everyone, and together arrived at Holboncheon (or Holbon Stream). Chumo wanted to build palace on Mountain, but he wasn't able to afford it. Thus he built a thatched house near Biryusu (or Biryu River) and lived there. He named his new founding nation as Goguryeo, and changed his surname to Go at the age of 21 (B.C. 37). People who heard of the news of the birth of new nation joined him.

Rule 
[B.C. 37] In the first year, Chumo launched preemptive strike on Mohe near the border, fearing pillages from them. Mohe surrendered after the fight.

One day, Chumo saw vegetable leaves were floating on the Biryu River. He went hunting toward upper stream, and arrived at Biryuguk (or State of Biryu). Song Yang, the king of Biryu, saw Chumo and told him to submit under him since the State of Biryu is stronger and older. Two kings had arguments and competed with archery skill, which Chumo was victorious. [B.C. 36] In June, Song Yang surrendered to Chumo. Chumo renamed the land to Damuldo (or Damul City), and appointed Song Yang to be the Marquis of Damul and continue to rule the area.

[B.C. 34] On July, the construction of wall and palace was completed. [B.C. 32] In October, Chumo sent Oi and Bu Bunno, and conquered Haenginguk (or State of Haengin), which is located in southeast of Taebaek Mountain. [B.C. 28] In November, the king ordered Bu Wiyeom to attack Northern Okjeo, and Bu Wiyeom successfully made Northern Okjeo to submit under Goguryeo.

[B.C. 24] In August, Yuhwa died in Eastern Buyeo. The funeral was held and the shrine was built in the manner of dowager by Geumwa. On October, Chumo sent an envoy along with regional products to Buyeo as a recompense for the virtue and generosity shown from Geumwa.

[B.C. 19] On April, Yuryu and his mother fled from Buyeo, and arrived to Goguryeo. Chumo set Yuryu as the crowned prince of Goguryeo. On September, Chumo died at age of 39. He was buried at Yongsan (or Yong Mountain), and was posthumously given the title Dongmyeong-Seongwang.

Comparison and controversies 

By comparing the myths, we can presume the following after eliminating overlapping and glorifying parts:
 The legend of Dongmyeong was shared among Buyeo origin kingdoms—Buyeo, Goguryeo, and Baekje, with variations.
 There seem to be an ancient kingdom located in north of Buyeo, which existed before the creation of Buyeo.
 Dongmyeong and Chumo were considered as separate entity by Goguryeo; however, the legend was mixed together before the reign of Jangsu. Many Buyeo and Goguryeo royals married since the birth of kingdom of Goguryeo, and appear to be mixed naturally or purposely to claim legitimacy and subjugating Buyeo.
 Eastern Buyeo was created after the invasion of Xian Bei. Many people ran to North Okjeo, and found Eastern Buyeo rather than returning to Buyeo. The addition of Eastern Buyeo in the myth appears to be the process of claiming legitimacy and subjugating Eastern Buyeo, or was added during unified Silla or Goryeo period.
 The description of the Book of Wei has the most similarities with the story written in Samguk Sagi. The myth was completed, exception to Eastern Buyeo related stories, by the time when the Book of Wei was written.
 By the time when Samguk Sagi was written, Dongmyeong and Chumo were considered as same person, posthumously changing the title of Chumo to Dongmyeong. The story of Geumwa also seems to be influenced by Heokgeose of Silla.

Alternative story 
There is an alternative story of Chumo, which was annotated by compilators of Samguk Sagi. The name Soseono only appears here. The storyline can extend to the theory of coup led by Onjo, killing both Biryu and Soseono in order to claim Baekje for himself.

The following description is based on Samguk Sagi.

Both Biryu and Onjo were sons of Wu Tae, the bastard grandson of Hae Buru, and Soseono, the daughter of Holbon native Yeon Tabal. Unfortunately, Soseono became a widow after Wu Tae died. When Chumo arrived to Holbon, he established Goguryeo and married to Soseono.

Soseono supported Chumo every way possible, paving the way for the future of the Kingdom of Goguryeo, while Chumo helped raising her sons as if his own children. However, everything eventually turned against Soseono after Yuryu, the only biological son of Chumo from Lady Ye, came to Goguryeo and was appointed to the crowned prince. Biryu was displeased by the decision since Yuryu had zero contribution in creating the kingdom. Also in fear of purge by Yuryu after Chumo's death, Biryu led his followers along with Onjo and Soseono, and left Goguryeo to create his own kingdom.

Records by people of Goguryeo 
There are only handful of records from Goguryeo still remaining today as many are lost throughout centuries. According to the records, Chumo was born in Northern Buyeo. He arrived to Holbon, and built the capital on the mountain located west of Holbon. After He became tired of the throne, he went to the hill at east of Holbon, and died there.

Other records 
According to the Notes on History of the Three Kingdoms, previous Books written by Chinese dynasties made huge discrepancy on the history of Goguryeo by seeing the Old Goguryeo and the New Goguryeo as same entity, while separating Sosu Maek and the event written on Eastern Okjeo part. The Old Goguryeo was occupied by Han Dynasty shortly after the fall of Joseon, and became one of the county under Xuantu Commandery in B.C. 107. On the other hand, the New Goguryeo was founded by Chumo. In B.C. 82, New Goguryeo launched attack on Commanderies of Han, and was responsible for driving out Xuantu Commandery from original location to the northwest of Goguryeo. Based on this, Chumo was old enough to command his military force by B.C. 82, which directly challenges to the records from Samguk Sagi.

However, there are indications that Goguryeo was actually older than 705 years based on the recordings.
 Tombstone of Go Ja recognized the history of Goguryeo as 708 years old. (B.C. 42)
 Silla recognized the history of Goguryeo as 800 years old in A.D. 670. (≈ B.C. 130)
 Tang recognized the history of Goguryeo as 900 years old in A.D. 668. (≈ B.C. 232)

According to Gwanggaeto Stele, Gwanggaeto the Great was the 17th generation (世孫) while Samguk Sagi recorded as 13th generation of Chumo. There are two analysis on this:
 Gwanggaeto the Great was the 17th generation after Chumo.
 Gwanggaeto the Great was the 17th generation after Daejuryu.
Regardless which, there is missing history of Goguryeo within the Samguk Sagi per evidence left by people at the time.

Legacy 
The Kingdom of Goguryeo eventually evolved into a great regional territory with considerable power and influence. Goguryeo existed for 705 years and was ruled by 28 consecutive emperors of the Go Dynasty until the collapse of the central government by the Silla-Tang alliance in 668. Both Goryeo (Balhae) and Goryeo succeeded Goguryeo, and the modern descendants of Chumo still bear his family name of "Go."

In Goguryeo, Chumo was deified into an ancestral deity and he was worshipped throughout centuries.

Today, Korea's Heongseong Go clan (Hanja:橫城 高氏, Hangeul:횡성 고씨), China's Liaoyang Go clan (Hanzi:遼陽 高氏) and Japan's Koma clan (Kanji:高麗氏) consider him as the founder.

In popular culture 
From 2006 to 2007, MBC aired an 81-episode drama, Jumong, to mark the network's anniversary. The series took elements from historical records and mythology, and retold the story in a more down-to-earth manner than found in the myths, recounting how Jumong, the spoiled stepchild of the Buyeo royal family, embarks on a journey of self-discovery, becoming a leading figure of Buyeo, but retreats from Buyeo after his step-brothers' betrayal. Relaunching the armed and militarily capable guerrilla fighters' force his biological father Hae Mo-su once headed, Jumong goes on a life mission to rescue and band together the refugees of the ancient Joseon peoples, leading the fight against the oppression of Imperial China, finally establishing himself as the king of the new nation Goguryeo.

From 2010 to 2011, KBS1 aired King Geunchogo, also known as The King of Legend. In this series, Jumong is portrayed as a tyrant who could not accept sharing the power over Goguryeo with Soseono and the Jolbon faction. After Yuri of Goguryeo's arrival, the declared crown prince and successor to Jumong's throne, Soseono and all her subordinates and servants decided to leave "their beloved Goguryeo" to establish a new kingdom "much more powerful than Goguryeo ever was."

Since 2017, KCTV aired 고주몽 a historical animation, directed by Kim Kyung-ho at the SEK Studio. The animation contains the contents of Jumong, when he brings small countries of the same family together and builds up Goguryeo into a powerful nation. It deals with the history from the time when the parents Hae Mo-su and Yuhwa established their family until the birth of Jumong. In the first ten parts, Jumong tells the story of Buyeo, where he was born, and escaped. The first episode was broadcast on January 1, 2017, and so far 24 episodes have been broadcast. South Korean netizens were surprised at the quality development of the North Korean animation.

Actors who have played Jumong 
 Portrayed by Song Il-gook in the 2006-2007 MBC TV series Jumong.
 Portrayed by Lee Deok-hwa in the 2010-2011 KBS1 TV series The King of Legend.
 Portrayed by Jo Jang Ho in the 2017 KBS TV series Chronicles of Korea.

See also 
 List of monarchs of Korea
 History of Korea
 Three Kingdoms of Korea

Notes

References 

58 BC births
19 BC deaths
Goguryeo rulers
1st-century BC rulers in Asia
Deified Korean people
1st-century BC Korean people
Founding monarchs